Susanna H. Morton Braund (born 6 February 1957) is a professor of Latin poetry and its reception at the University of British Columbia.

Education 
Braund received her BA in Classics from the University of Cambridge in 1978, followed by a PhD in 1984 from the same institution.

Career 
Braund held appointments at the University of Exeter, the University of Bristol, Royal Holloway, University of London, Yale University and Stanford University before taking up her current professorship.

Since 2007, Braund has held a Tier 1 Canada Research Chair position in Latin Poetry and its Reception, which was renewed in 2014. Her research is on the translation history of Latin poetry.

Braund was elected as a Scholar in Residence at the Collège de France for June 2014.

In 2016, Braund was awarded a Killam Research Fellowship for the years 2016–2018, for a project on translations of Virgil's Aeneid, Georgics and Eclogues.

In 2018, Braund was elected as Corresponding Fellow to the Australian Academy of the Humanities.

Selected bibliography

Translations and editions 
Seneca, De Clementia: Edited with Text, Translation and Commentary (Oxford: Oxford University Press 2009) .
Juvenal and Persius (Loeb Classical Library vol. 91) (Cambridge, MA: Harvard University Press 2004) Parallel text Latin edition and English translation of both authors' works, with an introduction. .
Juvenal, Satires Book I (Cambridge: Cambridge University Press 1996). Text with an introduction and commentary. .
Lucan, Civil War: Translated with introduction and notes (Oxford: Oxford University Press 1992) Reissued as part of Oxford World's Classics.

Books and edited volumes 
Virgil and his Translators, ed. with Zara Martirosova Torlone (Oxford: Oxford University Press 2018), .
Latin Literature (London and New York: Routledge 2002) . Second edition: Understanding Latin Literature (London and New York: Routledge 2017) ).
The Roman Satirists and their Masks (London: Bristol Classical Press/Duckworth 1996) .
Satire and Society in Ancient Rome (Exeter Studies in History 23), (Liverpool: Liverpool University Press 1989) .
Beyond Anger: A Study of Juvenal’s Third Book of Satires (Cambridge: Cambridge University Press 1988) .

Podcast appearances 
Entitled Opinions: 'Susanna Braund on Virgil's Aeneid'. 25 October 2005.

References

External links
Faculty page, University of British Columbia

Living people
Women classical scholars
British classical scholars
Alumni of the University of Cambridge
Academic staff of the University of British Columbia
1957 births
Academics of the University of Exeter
Academics of the University of Bristol
Academics of Royal Holloway, University of London
Yale University faculty
Stanford University faculty
Fellows of the Australian Academy of the Humanities